The Hot Ice Show is a long-running ice show at Blackpool Pleasure Beach, United Kingdom. The show has been running at the park since 1936, when it began production as the Ice Parades. It is performed in the Pleasure Beach Arena, formerly the Ice Drome, which was the UK's first purpose-built ice rink opened in 1937. The show usually runs from July to September and is curated by Pleasure Beach managing director Amanda Thompson.

History
In 2009, the show was cancelled due to work being done to the arena.
In 2020, the show was postponed due to the COVID-19 pandemic.

Cast lists

Rapture (2022)

Euphoria (2021)

Utopian (2019)

Mesmerise (2018)

Dreams (2017)

Obsession (2016)

Desire (2015)

Passion (2014)

Allure (2013)

Entice (2012)

Aura (2011)

Enchanted (2010)

The Edge (2008)

The Mix (2007)

Amarin (2006)

Chill (2005)

Xylatomia (2004)

H2O (2003)

Quixotic (2002)

Va Voom (2001)

Rhythmos (2000)

Show in 1999

Show in 1998

Show in 1997

Show in 1996

Show in 1995

References

External links
 
 Blackpool Pleasure Beach

Tourist attractions in Blackpool
Figure skating in the United Kingdom